Aux Trois Couvents, formerly known as the Centre d'Interprétation de la Côte-de-Beaupré (CICB), located in Château-Richer on the royal avenue, is renowned as a museum of La Côte-de-Beaupré by the M.R.C since 1996. It is also a part of the Route de la Nouvelle-France group, one of the oldest roads of Quebec.

Mission

Aux Trois Couvents' mission is to educate the public about the history and the heritage of the Beaupré Coast region with the use of exhibitions and cultural and educational activities.

History

Created in 1984 at the formation of the MRC, the CICB is non-profit organization, recognized and sustained by the Ministère de la Culture, des Communications et de la Condition féminine du Québec. First established at the Moulin à eau du Petit-Pré de Château-Richer, the CICB acquired, in 2000, the old convent of Château Richer. After renovating and restoring it, the CICB moved into the old convent and in doing so gained about four times the room.

The CICB offers to visitors the opportunity to discover aspects of the geography, history, culture and heritage of the Beaupre-Coast region.

Expositions

The CICB offers multiple permanent exhibitions to its visitors, which allows them to fully understand the history of the Beaupre-Coast and of the Chateau-Richer Convent.
Regard, la côte des beaux prés dans tous ses éclats traces a thematic portrait of the region from its colonization to today.
The Site historique et archéologique des Vieux Couvents de Château-Richer retraces the history of the three convents of Chateau-Richer thanks to archeological digs accessible at all times.
The classe d'antan is a reconstitution of one of the classrooms from the beginning of the 20th century where visitors can see where and how students were taught at the time.

The CICB also offers temporary exhibitions to visitors.

History of the Chateau-Richer convents

First convent of Chateau-Richer
Before the construction of the first convent, there was a windmill that was built in 1655. Archeological digs made in 1998 enabled us to discover the remains of this windmill.

In 1694, Lord François de Laval, lord of the Beaupre-Coast, commissioned the construction of the first convent so that it may be used as a school for girls. Nuns from the congregation of Notre-Dame, under the direction of Marguerite Bourgeoys, became teachers for the girls of the region. Three nuns, one as superior and two as teachers, taught young girls how to read, write and count. They also taught them history, geography, religion, as well as housework. Boys were instead schooled at the senioral manor, as recommended by Lord Laval. in 1759, Quebec city and the Beaupre-Coast region were being invaded by the English army. Under the command of General James Wolfe, the troops captured any resources that they could, and burned down just about everything else, including the convent of Chateau-Richer.

Second couvent of Chateau-Richer

In 1829, the second convent is built right on the foundations of the first convent. Beginning in 1830, the becomes once again a school for girls, under various administrations. Despite numerous reparations and renovations, the building rapidly deteriorates because of flooding problems combined with bad drainage. A constant state of dampness combined with contamination by the water in the nearby latrines leads to a spread of diseases among the teachers and students. In 1906, the building is demolished in order to allow for the construction of a newer, better planned building.

Third convent of Chateau-Richer

By 1907, the construction of the third convent begins. This building will serve as a school as well, but this time for boys, as well as girls. It also held a chapel, a kitchen, a dormitory, and housing for the nuns. In 1972, the building ceased to act as a school, as another school was constructed nearby that could fit a much greater number of students. Instead, it becomes a community centre. In 2002, the building is bought by the provincial government of Quebec to become the CICB that it is today.

Museums in Capitale-Nationale
History museums in Quebec
Heritage buildings of Quebec